St. Pauls is a town in Robeson County, North Carolina, United States. The population was 2,035 at the 2010 census.

History
The town of St. Pauls was built up around St. Pauls Presbyterian Church, which was built on land donated in 1799 by William Davis. St. Pauls grew slowly from a town of just the church, Davis' home, a post office and livery stable. The livery was built at the 16-mile post on the Fayetteville to Lumberton stage coach road. Growth began in earnest following the construction of the Robeson Institute, a co-educational school that served the children of northern Robeson County.

The construction of the Virginia and Carolina Southern Railway through St. Pauls helped establish the community as a leading producer of textiles. Three cotton mills were constructed in the early part of the 20th century. The mills experienced periods of success and failure before coming under control of the Burlington Mills Corporation in 1943. The mills provided significant tax revenue to the town, at one point enabling it to supply free water, sewer, and trash services to residents. Nearly all the mills closed in the 1990s as the textile industry moved from the American South to Latin America and Southeast Asia. The closure of two yarn plants in 2001 led to the loss of over 500 jobs. In the 2000s the job market in the town stagnated, experiencing only minimal growth from the commercial sector developed near Interstate 95. In the 2010s the town secured multiple large corporate investments and relocations.

The Gilmore-Patterson Farm and Kenneth McKinnon House are listed on the National Register of Historic Places.

Geography
St. Pauls is located at  (34.807329, −78.972746).

Demographics

2020 census

As of the 2020 United States census, there were 2,045 people, 884 households, and 463 families residing in the town.

2010 census
As of the 2010 United States Census, there were 2,035 people living in the town. The racial makeup of the town was 48.9% White, 18.5% Black, 5.4% Native American, 0.2% Asian, 0.1% Pacific Islander, 0.1% from some other race and 1.7% from two or more races. 25.1% were Hispanic or Latino of any race.

2000 census
As of the census of 2000, there were 2,137 people, 859 households, and 571 families living in the town. The population density was 1,601.2 people per square mile (620.4/km). There were 935 housing units at an average density of 700.6 per square mile (271.4/km). The racial makeup of the town was 25.32% White, 60.46% African American, 3.56% Native American, 0.37% Asian, 0.05% Pacific Islander, 8.14% from other races, and 2.11% from two or more races. Hispanic or Latino of any race were 14.74% of the population.

29.8% of households had children under the age of 18 living with them, 41.9% were married couples living together, 17.5% had a female householder with no husband present, and 33.5% were non-families. 30.8% of all households were made up of individuals, and 14.7% had someone living alone who was 65 years of age or older. The average household size was 2.49 people and the average family size was 3.02 members.

The median income for a household in the town was $22,347, and the median income for a family was $27,708. Males had a median income of $27,218 versus $20,750 for females. The per capita income for the town was $12,520. About 17.2% of families and 22.8% of the population were below the poverty line, including 26.4% of those under age 18 and 24.9% of those age 65 or over.

The town has an elementary school, a middle school, and a high school, all named after St. Pauls. The population was spread out, with 25.8% under the age of 18, 10.7% from 18 to 24, 28.1% from 25 to 44, 21.8% from 45 to 64, and 13.7% who were 65 years of age or older. The median age was 35 years. There were 94.8 males for every 100 females, and 89.7 males for every 100 females age 18 and over.

Sports
The Carolina Raging Wolves of the Women's Football Alliance plays at St. Pauls High School, located in the town.

Notable people 
 Judy Clay, soul and gospel singer, was born in St. Pauls.
 John Beard, news anchor, was born in St. Pauls.

References

Works cited

External links
 Official website
 St. Pauls Chamber of Commerce

Towns in Robeson County, North Carolina
Towns in North Carolina